Xedit or XEDIT may refer to:

 X11 Xedit, a text editor for the X Window System on Linux and UNIX
 XEDIT, a visual text editor for the VM/CMS operating system
 Xedit, a command-line based text editor for CDC computers running the NOS operating system